A residue numeral system (RNS) is a numeral system representing integers by their values modulo several pairwise coprime integers called the moduli. This representation is allowed by the Chinese remainder theorem, which asserts that, if  is the product of the moduli, there is, in an interval of length , exactly one integer having any given set of modular values. The arithmetic of a residue numeral system is also called multi-modular arithmetic.

Multi-modular arithmetic is widely used for computation with large integers, typically in linear algebra, because it provides faster computation than with the usual numeral systems, even when the time for converting between numeral systems is taken into account. Other applications of multi-modular arithmetic include polynomial greatest common divisor, Gröbner basis computation and cryptography.

Definition

A residue numeral system is defined by a set of  integers

called the moduli, which are generally supposed to be pairwise coprime (that is, any two of them have a greatest common divisor equal to one). Residue number systems have been defined for non-coprime moduli, but are not commonly used because of worse properties. Therefore, they will not be considered in the remainder of this article.

An integer  is represented in the residue numeral system by the set of its remainders

under Euclidean division by the moduli. That is 

and

for every 

Two integers whose difference is a multiple of  have the same representation in the residue numeral system defined by the s. More precisely, the Chinese remainder theorem asserts that each of the  different sets of possible residues represents exactly one residue class modulo . That is, each set of residues represents exactly one integer  in the interval . For signed numbers, the dynamic range is 
(when  is even, generally an extra negative value is represented).

Arithmetic operations

For adding, subtracting and multiplying numbers represented in a residue number system, it suffices to perform the same modular operation on each pair of residues. More precisely, if 

Subtraction and multiplication are defined similarly.

For a succession of operations, it is not necessary to apply the modulo operation at each step. It may be applied at the end of the computation, or, during the computation, for avoiding overflow of hardware operations.

However, operations such as magnitude comparison, sign computation, overflow detection, scaling, and division are difficult to perform in a residue number system.

Comparison

If two integers are equal, then all their residues are equal. It follows that testing equality is easy.

At the opposite, testing inequalities is difficult and, usually, requires to convert integers to the standard representation. As a consequence, this representation of numbers is not suitable for algorithms using inequality tests, such Euclidean division and Euclidean algorithm.

Division

Division in residue numeral systems is problematic.

can be easily calculated by

Applications

RNS have applications in the field of digital computer arithmetic. By decomposing in this a large integer into a set of smaller integers, a large calculation can be performed as a series of smaller calculations that can be performed independently and in parallel.

See also
 Covering system
 Reduced residue system

References

Further reading

 
  (viii+418+6 pages)
Chervyakov, N. I.; Molahosseini, A. S.; Lyakhov, P. A. (2017). Residue-to-binary conversion for general moduli sets based on approximate Chinese remainder theorem. International Journal of Computer Mathematics, 94:9, 1833-1849, doi: 10.1080/00207160.2016.1247439.
 
Chervyakov, N. I.; Lyakhov, P. A.; Deryabin, M. A. (2020). Residue Number System-Based Solution for Reducing the Hardware Cost of a Convolutional Neural Network. Neurocomputing, 407, 439-453, doi: 10.1016/j.neucom.2020.04.018.
  (1+7 pages)
  (296 pages)
  (351 pages)
  (389 pages)
  Division algorithms
 
 
 
 
 
 
 
 
 
Isupov, Konstantin (2021). "High-Performance Computation in Residue Number System Using Floating-Point Arithmetic". Computation. 9 (2): 9. doi:10.3390/computation9020009. ISSN 2079-3197.

Modular arithmetic
Computer arithmetic